4/5 or  may refer to:
April 4 (month-day date notation)
4 May (day-month date notation)